Lotería (Spanish word meaning "lottery") is a traditional game of chance, similar to bingo, but using images on a deck of cards instead of numbered ping pong balls. Every image has a name and an assigned number, but the number is usually ignored. Each player has at least one , a board with a randomly created 4 x 4 grid of pictures with their corresponding name and number. Players choose a tabla (Spanish word for "board") to play with, from a variety of previously created , each with a different selection of images.

The traditional Lotería card deck is composed of a set of 54 different cards, each with a different picture. To start the game, the caller (cantor, Spanish for "singer") shuffles the deck. One by one, the caller picks a card from the deck and announces it to the players by its name, sometimes using a verse before reading the card name. Each player locates the matching pictogram of the card just announced on their board and marks it off with a chip or other kind of marker. In Mexico, it is traditional to use small rocks, crown corks or pinto beans as markers.

History

The origin of  can be traced far back in history. The game originated in Italy in the 15th century and was brought to New Spain (modern Mexico) in 1769. In the beginning,  was a hobby of the upper classes, but eventually it became a tradition at Mexican fairs.

Don Clemente Jacques began publishing the game in 1887. His version of the game was distributed to Mexican soldiers along with their rations and supplies.

The images Don Clemente used in his card designs have become iconic in Mexican culture, as well as gaining popularity in the U.S. and some European countries. Don Clemente's cards also had a part in representing and normalizing different aspects of Mexico's national identity during the 19th century. Many of the pictures used in Don Clemente's  resemble the Major Arcana of Tarot cards used for divination (which, in turn, are based on cards used in Tarot card games).

Alternative versions 
 is a variant version of the traditional Mexican , where the basic rules apply. For this version, before the game begins, players agree on how many  are to be completed in a row, column or diagonal pattern. A  is a group of images in a square. The square may contain 2 x 2 (4) or 3 x 3 (9) images for a traditional .

Cards and associated verses

The following is a list of the original 54  cards, traditionally and broadly recognized in Mexico. Below each card name and number, are the verses (in Spanish) sometimes used to tell the players which card was drawn. However, there are several less traditional sets of cards, depicting different objects or animals.

1  ("the rooster")

The one that sang for St. Peter will never sing for him again.

2  ("the little Devil")

Behave yourself buddy, or the little red one will take you away.

3  ("the lady")

Improving her gait, all along the main street

4  ("the dandy")

Sir Ferruco in the poplar grove, wanted to toss away his cane.

5  ("the umbrella")

For the sun and for the rain.

6  ("the mermaid")

Don't be swayed by the songs of the siren. (In Spanish, sirens and mermaids and their song is synonymous.)

7  ("the ladder")

Ascend me step by step, don't try and skip.

8  ("the bottle")

The tool of the drunk.

9  ("the barrel")

So much did the bricklayer drink, he ended up like a barrel.

10  ("the tree")

He who nears a good tree, is blanketed by good shade.

11  ("the melon")

Give it to me or take it from me.

12  ("the brave man")

Why do you run, coward? Having such a good blade too.

13  ("the little bonnet")

Put the bonnet on the baby, lest he catch a cold.

14  ("Death")

Death, thin and lanky.

15  ("the pear")

 He who waits despairs. (A pun:  "to wait" and  "to be a pear" are homophones in Mexican Spanish.)

16  ("the flag")

Green, white, and red, the flag of the soldier.

17  ("the mandolin")

There playing his lute, is Simon the mariachi.

18  ("the cello")

Growing it reached the heavens, and since it wasn't a violin, it had to be a cello.

19  ("the heron")

At the other side of the river I have my sand bank, where sits my darling short one, with the beak of a great blue heron.

20  ("the bird")

You have me hopping here and there, like a bird on a branch.

21  ("the hand")

The hand of a criminal.

22  ("the boot")

A boot the same as the other.

23  ("the moon")

The street lamp of lovers.

24  ("the parrot")

Parrot, parrot, stick out your claw and begin to chat with me.

25  ("the drunkard")

Oh what an annoying drunk, I can't stand him any more.

26  ("the little black man")

The one who ate the sugar.

27  ("the heart")

Do not miss me, sweetheart, I'll be back by bus.

28  ("the watermelon")

The swollen belly that Juan had, was from eating too much watermelon.

29  ("the drum")

Don't you wrinkle, dear old leather, since I want you for a drum.

30  ("the shrimp")

The shrimp that slumbers is taken by the tides.

31  ("the arrows")

The arrows of Adam the Indian, strike where they hit.

32  ("the musician")

The rubber-lipped musician does not want to play for me anymore.

33  ("the spider")

Beat it silly with a stick, do not let it near me.

34  ("the soldier")

One, two and three, the soldier heads to the fort.

35  ("the star")

Sailor's guide.

36  ("the saucepan")

The attention I pay you is little. (A pun:  "attention" and  "saucepan" are homophones in Mexican Spanish)

37  ("the world")

This world is a ball, and we a great mob. (A pun: bola can mean both "ball, sphere" and "crowd, mob", bolón is a superlative with the latter meaning)

38  ("the Apache")

Ah, Chihuahua! So many Apaches with pants and sandals.

39  ("the prickly pear cactus")

People go to see the prickly pear, only when it bears fruit .

40  ("the scorpion")

He who stings with his tail, will get a beating.

41  ("the rose")

Rosita, Rosaura, come, as I want you here now.

42  ("the skull")

As I passed by the cemetery, I found myself a skull.

43  ("the bell")

You with the bell and I with your sister.

44  ("the little water pitcher")

So often does the jug go to the water, that it breaks and wets your slip.

45  ("the deer")

Jumping it goes searching, but it doesn't see anything. (A pun:  "deer" sounds like  "see nothing")

46  ("the sun")

The blanket of the poor.

47  ("the crown")

The hat of kings.

48  ("the canoe")

Lupita rows as she may, sitting in her little boat.

49  ("the pine tree")

Fresh and fragrant, beautiful in any season.

50  ("the fish")

The one who dies by its mouth, even if he were mute. (In reference to a fish being hooked by its mouth, even though it doesn't utter a sound.)

51  ("the palm tree")

Palmer, climb the palm tree and bring me a coconut fit for kings. (Lit: "A royal coconut.")

52  ("the flowerpot")

He who is born to be a flowerpot, does not go beyond the hallway.

53  ("the harp")

Old harp of my mother-in-law, you are no longer fit to play.

54  ("the frog")

What a jump your sister gave, as she saw the green frog.

Google tribute
On December 9, 2019, Google celebrated  with a Google Doodle.

Film adaptation
In July 2021, Netflix announced a film adaptation based around the game with James Bobin set to direct and Eugenio Derbez in a leading role.

References

Further reading
 Lotería: A Novel, by Mario Alberto Zambrano
 Playing Lotería: El Juego de La Lotería, by René Colato Laínez
 El Arte de la Suerte, by Artes de Mexico Número 13, Otoño 1991, Nueva Época
 Loteria Rules and how to play

External links
 
 Software to print Lotería: Loteria Workshop
 Pictures of different lotería decks
 Lotería de pozo : Another way to play lotería
 Rules and pictures 
 Loterias Nacional 

Bingo
Dedicated deck card games
Mexican-American culture
Mexican culture
Mexican card games